Brazil has participated in all the IAAF World Indoor Championships in Athletics since the beginning in 1985 IAAF World Indoor Games. Brazil won a total of 17 medals (5 gold, 6 silver and 6 bronze). Brazil is 26th on the all time medal table.

Medalists

Source:

Medal tables

By championships

By event

By gender

Best Finishes

Men

Women

See also
 Brazil at the World Championships in Athletics
 Brazil at the Olympics
 Brazil at the Pan American Games

References

Indoor Championships in Athletics
Nations at the World Athletics Indoor Championships